Yoo Se-yoon (born September 12, 1980) is a South Korean comedian and television comedy show host. He hosts and co-hosts a variety of shows, in addition to being a part of musical/comedic duo, UV. Yoo has been a part of shows such as South Korean talk show Non-Summit, Witch Hunt, SNL Korea, South Korean talk show Golden Fishery as well as its segments, Knee Drop Guru and Radio Star.

Early life
Yoo was born to parents Yo Un-ja(mother) and Yoo Young-Tae(father) in 1980. Yoo grew up with his mom, as his parents went through a divorce when he was in elementary school.
 Yoo originally dreamed of being a movie director when he was young.

Career

Comedy
Yoo debuted in his first comedy sketch called "Navigation" on May 2, 2005, with comedian Yoo sang moo and Jang Dong-min. Yoo played a character of a 'bokhaksaeng' (returning student, usually after mandatory military service or other hardships, that could not keep up with the trends with his peers) in 2005 in the popular comedy segment called 'Bongsungahakdang', then known with the catch phrase "Colour Power!", and gained popularity with another comedy segment called "Are you kidding?(장난하냐?)". Yoo also gained popularity in 2006 with a comedy segment called "Love counselor(사랑의 카운슬러)", where the relatable stories of couples told in a comedic fashion contributing the reason for the popularity.

Music (UV)
UV is a hip hop musical/comedic duo consisting of Yoo and hip-hop artist Muzie/Muzi from High Syde. They are known for creating music with comedic lyrics and only promote their work through their own show on South Korean music channel, Mnet titled "UV Syndrome".

UV debuted in 2010 with "No Cool, I'm Sorry", a song that depicts a break up between two lovers in a comical light. In later works, they created parodies including "Itaewon Freedom" featuring CEO of JYP Entertainment/musician Park Jin-young, and "Who am I" based on The Beatles. The music video of "Convenience", also released in 2010, featured characters and artwork from Welcome to Convenience Store.

In 2011, UV performed in the New Year festivities to welcome Year 2012 at Times Square (Seoul).

In August 2013, UV released EP "It Can't Be True". This release marked the return of Yoo to the entertainment industry after voluntarily surrendering to police for driving under the influence in May 2013.

UV performed on and had writing credits for several songs on the 'Original Motion Picture Soundtrack' of 2014 Korean movie 플랜맨 (The Plan Man).

Music (Solo)
Occasionally, Yoo releases musical parodies on various aspects of pop culture such as his second EP titled "Kkattalk" which makes fun of the South Korean instant messaging service KakaoTalk.

Legal troubles
In 2013, Yoo self-confessed his drunk driving after driving his car for 30kms.

Filmography

Film

Television show

Web shows

References

External links 
 yooseyoon.com
 

South Korean television presenters
South Korean comedians
People from South Chungcheong Province
1980 births
Living people
Gag Concert
Weekly Idol members
21st-century South Korean male singers